Bilsthorpe is a civil parish in the Newark and Sherwood district of Nottinghamshire, England.  The parish contains four listed buildings that are recorded in the National Heritage List for England.   Of these, one is listed at Grade I, the highest of the three grades, and the others are at Grade II, the lowest grade.  The parish contains the village of Bilsthorpe and the surrounding countryside, and the listed buildings consist of a church with associated features, a house and a farmhouse.


Key

Buildings

References

Citations

Sources

 

Lists of listed buildings in Nottinghamshire